The London Record Society is a text publication society founded in 1964 whose objectives are to stimulate public interest in archives and similar historical material relating to London. The current President of the society is the Lord Mayor of London. The Society is a registered charity.

Activities
The society holds an annual public lecture about London archives and publishes transcripts, translations, abstracts and lists of primary sources relating to the history of London. The society usually publishes one major scholarly work per annum which is provided free to members. Typical recent publications have included:

Extra Series

From volume 46 onwards, the society's publications have been published by Boydell and Brewer, from whom the society's back catalogue is also available. Volumes 1–40 are available at British History Online.

See also
List of London Record Society publications

References

External links

British History Online.

1964 establishments in the United Kingdom
Regional and local learned societies of the United Kingdom
Text publication societies
History of London
History of the City of London
History books about London
History organisations based in London
Book publishing companies of England